"The Keeper of the Stars" is a song written by Dickey Lee, Danny Mayo and Karen Staley, and recorded by American country music artist Tracy Byrd.  It was released in February 1995 as the fourth and last single from his album No Ordinary Man, it went on to reach a peak of #2 on the Billboard Hot Country Singles & Tracks (now Hot Country Songs) charts, behind "I Can Love You Like That" by John Michael Montgomery. A year after its release, it was named Song of the Year by the Academy of Country Music.

Content
The song is a ballad in which the singer addresses his lover, telling her that a third party must have been responsible for bringing them together. Specifically, that third party is defined as being "the keeper of the stars" (i.e., God).

Re-recordings
A different recording of the song, one semitone lower than the album version, was released as the radio edit. This re-recording was made because Byrd felt that he sang it better in a lower key, and sang it as such while performing in concert. The radio edit was also used in the song's music video, which was directed by Michael Merriman, and premiered in early 1995.

Byrd re-recorded the song again in 2001 for his album Ten Rounds, and that particular re-recording was reprised on his 2005 Greatest Hits package.

Chart performance
Initially, Byrd's label (MCA Records) had not planned for "The Keeper of the Stars" to be a single, until his publicist realized that the song had been receiving positive feedback for it in concert. The fourth single from Byrd's No Ordinary Man album, "The Keeper of the Stars" spent twenty weeks on the Billboard Hot Country Singles & Tracks (now Hot Country Songs) charts, reaching a peak position of number two.

Year-end charts

References

External links
Song lyrics at Yahoo! Music

1995 singles
1994 songs
Tracy Byrd songs
Songs written by Dickey Lee
Songs written by Danny Mayo
MCA Nashville Records singles
Songs written by Karen Staley
Song recordings produced by Jerry Crutchfield